Alania was the medieval state of the Alans or Alani people in the North Caucasus.

Alania may also refer to:
Ossetia, an ethnolinguistic region located in the Caucasus
Republic of North Ossetia–Alania, a federal subject of the Russian Federation
The State of Alania, the second official name of the disputed Republic of South Ossetia
Alania Airlines, an airline based in Vladikavkaz, North Ossetia–Alania
FC Alania Vladikavkaz, a Russian football club from Vladikavkaz
Alanïa, a Norwegian former electronic music group
Alania TV, Georgian TV channel broadcasting in the Russian language
Alania (amphipod), a genus of amphipods in the family Stegocephalidae
Alania (plant), a genus of plants in the family Boryaceae

See also
Ossetian (disambiguation)
Alans, ancient nomadic-pastoralist Sarmatian tribes of the Caucasus
Alanian language, Scytho-Sarmatian language of the Eastern Iranian family, ancestor of modern Ossetian